Jonathan Taylor Thomas (born Jonathan Taylor Weiss; September 8, 1981) is an American actor and director. He is known for portraying Randy Taylor on Home Improvement and voicing young Simba in Disney's 1994 film The Lion King and Pinocchio in New Line Cinema's 1996 film The Adventures of Pinocchio.

Early life and education
Thomas was born in Bethlehem, Pennsylvania, and later moved to Sacramento, California, and then to Los Angeles.

Thomas's uncle was playwright and actor Jeff Weiss. Thomas has Pennsylvania Dutch (German) and Portuguese ancestry.

In 2000, Thomas graduated with honors from Chaminade College Preparatory School in West Hills, California.

Upon graduation, he enrolled at Harvard University, where he studied philosophy and history and spent his third year abroad at the University of St Andrews in Scotland.

In 2010, he graduated from the Columbia University School of General Studies.

Career

Television
Thomas began his television career in 1990, playing the role of Kevin Brady, the son of Greg Brady, on The Bradys, a spin-off of the 1970s TV show The Brady Bunch. In 1991, Thomas appeared in three episodes of Fox's sketch comedy series In Living Color. That same year, he was cast as Randy Taylor on ABC's sitcom Home Improvement. Thomas remained with Home Improvement well into his teenage years but left the show in 1998 to focus on academics.

In early 2004, Thomas had a small guest role on 8 Simple Rules for Dating My Teenage Daughter, another ABC sitcom, and appeared in the WB's Smallville in 2002 and 2004. In 2005, he appeared in UPN's high school detective drama Veronica Mars and was also featured on The E! True Hollywood Storys episode on Home Improvement.

On March 22, 2013, Thomas guest-starred on the second-season finale of his third ABC sitcom, Last Man Standing, and again in the fourth episode of the third season on October 11, 2013, reuniting with Tim Allen, his TV father from Home Improvement. On January 10, 2015, Thomas again guest-starred on the twelfth episode of the fourth season of Last Man Standing, this time as Randy, reuniting with his TV parents from Home Improvement, Tim Allen and Patricia Richardson.

Film
Thomas appeared in many films during and after his run on Home Improvement. He had a few roles as a voice actor in his child years, including Disney's animated feature The Lion King, in which he voiced the protagonist Simba as a cub.

He also appeared in live-action films. Among the ones he starred in are those from Disney: Man of the House, Tom and Huck, and I'll Be Home for Christmas. Other live-action films starring Thomas are an adaptation of The Adventures of Pinocchio (in which he played and voiced the titular character), Wild America, Speedway Junky, and Walking Across Egypt.

Filmography

Film

Television

Video games

Production credits

Awards and nominations

Wins
 1994 – Young Artist Awards for Outstanding Youth Ensemble in a Television Series (Home Improvement)
 1996 – ShoWest Convention: ShoWest Award for Young Star of the Year
 1997 – Young Artist Awards for Best Performance in a Voiceover – Young Artist (The Adventures of Pinocchio)
 1998 – Kids' Choice Awards: Blimp Award for Favorite Television Actor (Home Improvement)
 1999 – Kids' Choice Awards: Hall of Fame Award

Nominations
 1993 – Young Artist Awards for Best Young Actor Starring in a Television Series (Home Improvement)
 1995 – Academy of Science Fiction, Fantasy & Horror Films: Saturn Award for Best Performance by a Younger Actor (The Lion King)
 1995 – Young Artist Awards for Best Performance by a Young Actor in a Voiceover – TV or Movie (The Lion King)
 1996 – Young Artist Awards for Best Young Leading Actor – Feature Film (Tom and Huck)
 1996 – Kids' Choice Awards: Blimp Award for Favorite Movie Actor (Tom and Huck)
 1997 – Kids' Choice Awards: Blimp Award for Favorite Television Actor (Home Improvement)
 1997 – Academy of Science Fiction, Fantasy & Horror Films: Saturn Award for Best Performance by a Younger Actor (The Adventures of Pinocchio)
 1997 – YoungStar Awards for Best Performance by a Young Actor in a Comedy TV Series (Home Improvement)
 1997 – YoungStar Awards for Best Performance by a Young Actor in a Comedy Film (Tom and Huck)
 1998 – YoungStar Awards for Best Performance by a Young Actor in a Comedy TV Series (Home Improvement)
 1999 – Kids' Choice Awards: Blimp Award for Favorite TV Actor (Home Improvement)

References

External links

 

1981 births
Living people
Male actors from Pennsylvania
Male actors from New York (state)
Alumni of the University of St Andrews
American male child actors
American male film actors
American people of Pennsylvania Dutch descent
American people of Portuguese descent
American male television actors
American male voice actors
Columbia University School of General Studies alumni
People from Bethlehem, Pennsylvania
20th-century American male actors
21st-century American male actors
Harvard University alumni
Chaminade College Preparatory School (California) alumni